= Oprandi =

Oprandi is a surname. Notable people with the surname include:

- Romina Oprandi (born 1986), Swiss-Italian tennis player
- Sébastien Oprandi, French ice hockey player
